Atlas Shrugged is a trilogy of American science fiction drama films. The series, adaptations of Ayn Rand's 1957 novel of the same title, are subtitled Part I (2011), Part II (2012) and Part III (2014); the latter sometimes includes Who Is John Galt? in the title.

Synopsis
The films take place in a dystopian United States, wherein many of society's most prominent and successful industrialists abandon their fortunes as the government shifts the nation towards socialism, making aggressive new regulations, taking control of industries, while picking winners and losers.

 In Part I, railroad executive Dagny Taggart (Taylor Schilling) and steel mogul Henry Rearden (Grant Bowler) form an alliance to fight the increasingly authoritarian government of the United States. 
 In Part II, Taggart (Samantha Mathis) and Rearden (Jason Beghe) search desperately for the inventor of a revolutionary motor as the U.S. government continues to spread its control over the national economy. 
 In Part III, Taggart (Laura Regan) and Rearden (Rob Morrow) come into contact with the man responsible for the strike whose effects are the focus of much of the series.

Overview

Production
See Part I's production, Part II's production, Part III's production

Plot
See Part I's plot, Part II's plot, Part III's plot

Cast

Reception
The trilogy received predominantly negative critic reviews and the aggregate USA box office is just under $9 million, with each film performing worse than the last on both accounts. 
 The first film, directed by Paul Johansson, stars Taylor Schilling, Grant Bowler, Matthew Marsden, Johansson, Graham Beckel and Jsu Garcia was released in April 2011 and had a USA box office of $4.6 million on a budget of $20 million. Most of the marketing was done online. 
 The second film, directed by John Putch, stars Samantha Mathis, Jason Beghe, Patrick Fabian, D.B. Sweeney and Esai Morales, and had a USA box office of $3.3 million on a budget of $10 million. 
 The third film, directed by J. James Manera, stars Laura Regan, Rob Morrow, Greg Germann, Kristoffer Polaha, Lew Temple and Joaquim de Almeida, and had a USA box office of $0.8 million on a budget of under $5 million.

Home media
Part I was released on DVD and Blu-ray on November 8, 2011; Part II on February 19, 2013; and Part III on January 6, 2015.

References

External links
 
 
 

Film series introduced in 2011
2010s drama films
2010s science fiction films
American political drama films
American science fiction films
American dystopian films
American film series
Films about businesspeople
Film series based on American novels
Films based on science fiction novels
Trilogies
2010s English-language films
2010s American films